June 17th, 1994 is a documentary film by Brett Morgen released as part of ESPN's 30 for 30 series.

Summary
The documentary details the events of June 17, 1994, in which several noteworthy sporting events occurred during the police chase of O. J. Simpson. Morgen says the diversity of the events provides an opportunity "to look at the soul of America".

The documentary features no narration and also no interviews and consists simply of music set to clips from news sources during the day.

There are rare clips of sportscasters like Chris Berman and Bob Costas talking to their producers about how to deal with the O.J. story within the context of the events they were covering.

Critical reception
Robert Lloyd wrote in The Los Angeles Times: "Morgen juxtaposes the events of that day in a kind of associative round robin, finding points of contrast and commonality, of similar action and visual consonance, on which to turn his film. But he offers no other, more remote perspective; this is not a summing up of events, but rather a meditation, of an elemental sort, not just on sports but on the way of the world."

Rolling Stone writer Noel Murray ranks June 17th, 1994 as the best documentary in the 30 for 30 series as he saw the montage style of the film as a reflection on "how viewers process television", and argues that it comments on "how the media struggles to make sense of events that have no clear outcome."

Jimmy Traina of Sports Illustrated called it a "tremendously fun watch".

Events occurring during this day 
The events detailed in the documentary that occurred during the chase of Simpson are as follows.
 Arnold Palmer playing his final round at the 1994 U.S. Open (in a nod to the fact that 06/17/1994 had major events involving both Palmer and Simpson, a clip from a commercial that the two both-then-beloved athletes had filmed together in the 1970's for Hertz was shown).
 The commencement of the 1994 FIFA World Cup, hosted for the first time by the United States with Oprah Winfrey and then-president Bill Clinton presenting.
 The New York Rangers celebrating their win in the 1994 Stanley Cup Finals with a ticker tape parade on Broadway (the parade took place earlier in the day and was largely unaffected by the Simpson events).
 Game 5 of the 1994 NBA Finals between the Houston Rockets and the New York Knicks; most NBC affiliates split coverage between the game and the freeway chase (as narrated by NBC News anchor Tom Brokaw on a split-screen.
 Ken Griffey Jr. tying Babe Ruth's record of the most home runs (30) before June 30 and the team's 65th game of the 1994 MLB season.

Aftermath 
 The U.S. Open concluded on Monday, June 20, with Ernie Els winning a three-way playoff for the championship.
 The World Cup concluded on Sunday, July 17 with Brazil winning its 4th championship after Italy player Roberto Baggio missed a must-make penalty during a shootout to decide the title.
 The 1994 World Cup is also featured in another ESPN 30 for 30 documentary entitled The Two Escobars which follows Colombia men's national team player Andrés Escobar who scored an own goal for the United States on June 22. Escobar was murdered in Colombia on July 1st, reputedly by cartel-connected hitmen, enraged that his error led to the team being eliminated from the World Cup tournament
 The New York Rangers would not make another Stanley Cup Finals until 2014 where the team lost to the Los Angeles Kings four games to one, and they haven't won the Cup since 1994.
 The NBA Finals concluded June 22 with Houston winning the series in seven games. The Knicks would return to the NBA Finals in 1999 but lost that series 4-1 to the San Antonio Spurs, and haven't been back to the finals since then.
 The 1994 Major League Baseball season would end after the games of August 11 due to the player strike and with future Hall of Famer Ken Griffey Jr. hitting a total of 40 home runs. Major League Baseball didn't return until the 1995 regular season, and the long delay resulted in 18 games being cut from the schedule (though the 1995 World Series did take place on time).
 O.J.: Made in America won the Academy Award for Best Documentary Feature 23 years after the chase and was produced by ESPN, who were also responsible for this film.

References

External links
 ESPN Homepage
 
 New Zealand television promo on YouTube

Films directed by Brett Morgen
Films set in 1994
O. J. Simpson murder case
Arnold Palmer
2010 television films
2010 films
Collage film
1994 Major League Baseball season
30 for 30
New York Rangers
Films set in the 1990s
New York Knicks
1994 FIFA World Cup
Documentary films about the media
1994 in American sports
Houston Rockets
Documentary films about Los Angeles
Documentary films about New York City
Cultural depictions of O. J. Simpson
Collage television
2010s American films